The International Institute for Trauma and Addiction Professionals (IITAP) is one of the most well known for-profit organizations that provides training and certification for licensed and interned mental health professionals who want to treat sexual addiction and compulsive behavior in their clients.  Despite the concept of sexual addiction being contentious in the fields of psychology, medicine, and neuroscience, and was not included in the DSM as of 2017, the need for this type of certification has been demonstrated over several decades.

IITAP's training and certification program is based on the work of Dr. Patrick Carnes, who has been pioneering work in sexual compulsive behavior since the 1980s, and who founded IITAP. His daughter, Dr. Stephanie Carnes, also a renowned marriage and family therapist and CSAT-S, is IITAP's president.

Public interest in sexual addiction and IITAP's programs are often driven by celebrities caught up in scandal, and blaming their trouble on sexual addition.

References

External links 
 

Mental health organizations in Arizona
Counseling organizations
Sexual addiction
Sex therapy
Addiction organizations in the United States